Joyce Viola Hansen (born October 18, 1942) is an American writer and retired schoolteacher. She has earned recognition for her books for children and youth, particularly her historical fiction and non-fiction works about African-American history. Four of her books have been named to the honor list of the Coretta Scott King Awards, presented by the American Library Association.

Life 
Hansen was born in the Bronx, New York City on October 18, 1942. Her parents were Austin Victor, a photographer, and Lilian Dancy Hansen. She earned a bachelor's degree in English from Pace University (1972) and a master's degree in English from New York University (1978). For 22 years, she worked as a teacher in New York City public schools, before retiring in 1995. After retirement she lived with her husband in South Carolina and wrote.

Fiction 
Hansen has said that her writing is motivated by a drive to increase interest in reading among her students and others who are underrepresented in children's literature. Her first novel was The Gift-Giver (1980), about a group of friends living in the Bronx. She wrote two sequels to the book, Yellow Bird and Me (1986) and One True Friend (2001).

In addition to novels set in contemporary urban settings, Hansen has written a number of works of historical fiction about African-American history, including books about slavery and the Civil War. Which Way Freedom? (1986), her first work of historical fiction, was named a Coretta Scott King Honor Book. The book, about a Black teenager serving with the Union Army in the Civil War, was the first of a trilogy of books that included Out From This Place (1998) and The Heart Calls Home (1999).

Her novels The Captive (1994) and I Thought My Soul Would Rise and Fly: The Diary of Patsy, a Freed Girl (part of the Dear America series of books) were also named Coretta Scott King Honor Books.

Non-fiction 
Hansen has also written a number of non-fiction books for youth about African-American and African history. Women of Hope: African Americans Who Made A Difference (1998) features short biographies of thirteen influential Black women, including neurosurgeon Alexa Canady, astronaut Mae Jemison, and activist Fannie Lou Hamer. Kirkus Reviews called the book "inspirational" and  "effective as art and as history".

With Gary McGowan, Hansen wrote Breaking Ground, Breaking Silence: The Story of New York's African Burial Ground (1998). The book, which was named a Coretta Scott King Honor Book, detailed the 1991 discovery and excavation of a burial ground for slaves and free blacks in New York City. Also with McGowan, Hansen wrote Freedom Roads (2003), a non-fiction account of the Underground Railroad, which Kirkus called "well-written, well-documented, imaginatively arranged".

Hansen's 2004 book, African Princess: The Amazing Lives of Africa's Royal Women, profiles six prominent women, including Hatshepsut, Amina, and Elizabeth of Toro. A New York Times review called the book "[m]eticulously researched" and "rich with detail, drama and intrigue".

Selected works

Fiction 

 The Gift-Giver (1980) 
 Home Boy (1982) 
 Yellow Bird and Me (1986) 
 Which Way Freedom? (1986) 
 Out From this Place (1988) 
 The Captive (1994) 
 I Thought My Soul Would Rise and Fly: The Diary of Patsy, a Freed Girl (Dear America series, 1997, 2011) 
 The Heart Calls Home (1999)  
 One True Friend (2001) 
 Home is with Our Family (2010)

Non-fiction 

 Between Two Fires: Black Soldiers in the Civil War (1993) 
 Breaking Ground, Breaking Silence: The Story of New York's African Burial Ground (with Gary McGowan, 1998) 
 Women of Hope: African Americans Who Made A Difference (1998) 
 Freedom Roads: Searching for the Underground Railroad (with Gary McGowan, 2003) 
African Princess: The Amazing Lives of Africa's Royal Women (illustrated by Laurie McGaw, 2004)

References 

1942 births
Living people
Writers from the Bronx
20th-century American women writers
21st-century American women writers
Pace University alumni
New York University alumni
American children's writers
20th-century African-American women writers
20th-century African-American writers
21st-century African-American women writers
21st-century African-American writers